Dark Harvest is a 2006 horror novel by Norman Partridge. The book is set in a hamlet where its young men must confront a creature each year in the hopes that they will win a desirable prize.

A film adaptation of the novel was set to be released in 2022, but was pulled from the release schedule.

Synopsis

Plot 
The novel is set in an unnamed Midwestern hamlet where each year all of the young men take part in a yearly ritual where they hunt a giant pumpkin-headed creature that arises from the corn, known as both "Sawtooth Jack" and the "October Boy". They are tasked with catching the creature before it makes it to the hamlet's church, which it must do before midnight in order to win the ordeal. Girls are forbidden from participating or being outside during the hunt. The winner of the hunt receives the ability to leave the hamlet - something not otherwise possible- and his family is given a new home, car, and a year free from bills. Winners are frequently idolized and last year's winner, Jim Shepard, is no exception.

Unbeknownst to the participants, the truth behind the ritual is far darker than what they would expect. While the winner's family does receive their prizes, the winning boy is killed so that he may become the new creature the following year when he is resurrected as a gnarled monster with a pumpkin head. His father, this year Jim's father Dan, is forced to carve a face for the creature and then later persuade the creature to let itself be caught if it does happen to make it to the church by midnight. Many of the town's fathers are aware of the truth of the ritual, but still allow their sons to take part. This year the October Boy is determined that it will be the last year for the ritual.

Ultimately the October Boy manages to make it to the church with the help of some of the local teens, where he finds that his father has committed suicide. He also comes face to face with the hamlet's lawman, Jerry Ricks, who is determined that the ritual continue. Ricks's attempts are for naught, as he is shot and killed. The church and surrounding buildings are then set ablaze by the October Boy as the townspeople flee, now able to freely leave the hamlet.

Release 
Dark Harvest was first released in a limited edition, signed hardback in October 2006. The following year Tor Books issued the novel in e-book and paperback format.

Reception 
Publishers Weekly named it one of the 100 best books of the year. A reviewer for Dread Central was critical, writing that "the author forgot to tie up a lot of loose ends, for example why the entire town is in lock-down in the first place and dependent on the massacre of its perennial monster." The reviewer for the Austin Chronicle was more favorable, as they felt that "The only weakness is Partridge's insistence at times to intentionally use a distracting second-person narrative. That is but a small complaint."

Awards 

 Bram Stoker Award for Best Long Fiction (2006, won)

Film adaptation 

New Regency optioned the film rights, with Matt Tolmach to produce but was sold to Metro-Goldwyn-Mayer in April 2020 after New Regency dropped the film into turnaround. The film, which will star newcomers Casey Likes and E’myri Crutchfield in the lead roles, will be released by MGM, with a screenplay by Michael Gilio.

References

2007 American novels
Novels set in the Midwestern United States
Novels set in the United States
Bram Stoker Award for Best Long Fiction winners
American horror novels